Ro60-0175 is a drug developed by Hoffmann–La Roche, which has applications in scientific research. It acts as a potent and selective agonist for both the 5-HT2B and 5-HT2C serotonin receptor subtypes, with good selectivity over the closely related 5-HT2A subtype, and little or no affinity at other receptors.

See also 
 AL-34662
 AL-38022A
 Ro60-0213
 VER-3323
 YM-348

References 

5-HT2B agonists
Serotonin receptor agonists
Indoles
Chloroarenes
Fluoroarenes
Hoffmann-La Roche brands